Pride of Performance (Urdu: تمغۂ حسنِ کارکردگی) is a civil award given by the Government of Pakistan to Pakistani citizens in recognition of distinguished merit in the fields of literature, arts, sports, medicine, or science for civilians

1970

1971

1972
Award not announced.

1973
Award not announced.

1974
 Iqbal Bano (ghazal and film singer)

1975
Chuadry Fazal Hussain Randahwa

1976
Parveen Shakir

1977
 Salamat Ali Khan (classical musician of Sham Chaurasia gharana)

1978

1979

References

Civil awards and decorations of Pakistan